Maharashtra, is a state in the western region of India. It is a second-most populous state after Uttar Pradesh and third largest state by area in India. Maharashtra is the wealthiest state in India, contributing 15% of the country's industrial output and 13.3% of its GDP (2006–2007 figures).

Maharashtra is the world's second-most populous first-level administrative country sub-division. Were it a nation in its own right, Maharashtra would be the world's tenth-most populous state, followed by Mexico. There are 41,000 villages and 378 urban centres in Maharashtra.

List of metropolitan areas in Maharashtra

See also 
List of metropolitan areas in India
List of cities in India by population
List of cities in Maharashtra by population

References

External links
 Census 2011

Maharashtra
 
Cities